Devil in Me is a 2012 album by Natalie Duncan.

Devil in Me or The Devil in Me may also refer to:

 The Devil in Me (album), by Thelma Houston (1977)
 The Dark Pictures Anthology: The Devil in Me, a video game released in 2022
 "The Devil in Me", a song by Jackson Jackson from the album Tools for Survival (2008) 
 "Devil in Me", a song by Alexandra Burke from the album Heartbreak on Hold (2012)
 "Devil in Me", a song by Halsey from the album Hopeless Fountain Kingdom (2017)
 "Devil in Me", a song by Purple Disco Machine from the album Soulmatic (2017)